("78 Days on the Street of Hate") is a German comic written and illustrated by David Füleki and first published by Delfinium Prints in 2008.

Plot
The Story follows the two main protagonists Def and Roy, two charming sociopaths chased by Interpol, on their journey which ends on day 78 with the end of the world. Chapter 1 starts with day 27 but the story jumps from one day to another which means that there isn't really any chronological order.

The first main story arc focuses on a tournament with obscure rules called Lausbuben Battle Royal. 40 competitors gather on an island to find out who's the greatest rascal of all time.

Released chapters
Chapter 1: 
Chapter 2: 
Chapter 3: 
Chapter 4: 
Chapter 5: 
Chapter 6: 
Chapter 7: 
Chapter 8: 
Chapter 9: 
Chapter 10:

Special Editions

A limited collector's edition called  was released at the end of 2008. The box contained the first five chapters with slight differences to the original releases. Furthermore, chapter five was a prerelease.

It consisted of the first seven chapters and two new special issues with short stories and illustrations made by many different German and Austrian artists. The regular issues had colored covers for the first time.

Spin Offs
Since 2010 two Spin-off-series featuring main or minor characters from the main series were released.

A collection of Yonkoma showing Roy in intimate relationships with different love interests. Most of the strips end with Roy's girlfriend dying or being hurt.

A story featuring the minor characters Hugi and his elephant Joe (both participants of the Lausbuben Battle Royal).

Bonus-Content
The 6th issue in 2009 of the German magazine Animania contained an exclusive short comic featuring Roy and Def fighting against Robo-Woman-Man as well as an alternative version of the first pages of chapter one.

External links
78 Tage-review at Germanga
78 Tage in Freibeutershop
Delfinium Prints

Comics by David Füleki
2008 comics debuts
Humor comics
Delfinium Prints
German comic strips